Blagoi Simeonov Popov (22 November 1902 – 28 December 1968) was a Bulgarian Communist activist and Comintern executive who was one of the co-defendants along with Georgi Dimitrov and Vasil Tanev in the Leipzig trial. 

After the trial, Popov moved to Moscow in February 1934. Popov studied there until 1937 when he was caught up in the Stalinist purges. He would spend the next seventeen years in a Soviet Gulag until he was officially rehabilitated in 1954.

References

1902 births
1968 deaths
Bulgarian communists
People from Pernik Province
Bulgarian people imprisoned abroad
Soviet rehabilitations
Bulgarian expatriates in the Soviet Union
Foreign Gulag detainees